Anita Bärwirth (30 August 1918 – 13 July 1994) was a German gymnast who competed in the 1936 Summer Olympics, as a member of the German women's gymnastics team. As there were no individual medals in women's gymnastics in 1936, Bärwith shared in the team's gold medal; her individual score was the ninth highest overall.

Bärwith was born in Kiel, Schleswig-Holstein, Germany. She later emigrated to Argentina, where her daughter, Olympic diver Cristina Hardekopf (also known as Christina Hardekopf) was born on December 9, 1940. Bärwith died in Buenos Aires on July 13, 1994.

References

1918 births
1994 deaths
German female artistic gymnasts
Olympic gymnasts of Germany
Gymnasts at the 1936 Summer Olympics
Olympic gold medalists for Germany
Olympic medalists in gymnastics
German emigrants to Argentina
Medalists at the 1936 Summer Olympics
Sportspeople from Kiel
20th-century German women